David (died 976) was a Bulgarian noble, brother of Emperor Samuel and eldest son of komes Nicholas, member of the Cometopuli dynasty. After the disastrous invasion of Rus' armies and the fall of North-eastern Bulgaria under Byzantine occupation in 971, he and his three younger brothers took the lead of the defence of the country. They executed their power together  and each of them governed and defended a separate region. He ruled the southernmost parts of the realm from Prespa and Kastoria and was responsible for the defence the dangerous borders with Thessalonica and Thessaly. In 976 he participated in the major assault against the Byzantine Empire but was killed by vagrant Vlachs between Prespa and Kostur.

Family tree

Notes

976 deaths
10th-century Bulgarian people
Bulgarian people of Armenian descent
Bulgarian princes
Cometopuli dynasty
Medieval Bulgarian military personnel
Medieval Bulgarian nobility
Year of birth unknown